Kothanda Ramaiah (also known as K.R and Keyaar) is an Indian Tamil film director, producer, distributor and exhibitor. He has held various leading positions in different film industry organizations.

Career

KR studied film processing at the Adyar Film Institute in Chennai in 1972. Upon graduation in 1975, he spent three years as a technician in Doordarshan Kendra. KR made his debut film as a director and producer with the Malayalam film Sisirathil Oru Vasantham. Prior to its release, the film faced a number of distribution problems and was eventually released by Suguna Screens in 1980. Although the film failed at the box office, it provided him the incentive to move into film distribution and exhibition across Tamil Nadu covering territories including: Chennai City, North Arcot, South Arcot, Chengelpet, Pondicherry, and Tirupathi. He distributed successful films such as: Thillu Mullu, Thai Veedu, Vaidehi Kathirunthal, Sindhu Bhairavi, Punnagai Mannan, Chinna Poove Mella Pesu, Michael Madana Kama Rajan, Poovizhi Vasalile, Guru Sishyan, Mappillai, Rajadhi Raja, and My Dear Kuttichathan 3D in Tamil.

Since 1991, KR has directed and produced a series of medium budget films. His directorial debut in Tamil Eeramana Rojave featured new actors and was a  huge commercial success. His most notable collaborations are with actors Vijayakanth, Ramki, Khushbu, and with Urvashi on several occasions. In total he has directed fourteen feature films. His film Dancer, released in 2005, most notable for its protagonist who was a one legged dancer played by Kutty, a highly talented and differently abled artist, won the National Award, three State Awards, and an award at the prestigious Canadian film festival. The film also had a special screening at the London Disability Arts Forum.

His involvement in film production includes producing and financing over forty films in various Indian Languages. While he was involved in film distribution he was also an exhibitor with twenty-eight theatres leased across: Tamil Nadu, Pondicherry, and Tirupathi; he also ran the Sathyam Cinemas in Chennai from 1984 to 1993.

He has played a role in some of the landmarks of Tamil cinema including: India's First ever 3D My Dear Kuttichathan in Tamil and Telugu; Pesum Padam a movie without dialogue starring Kamalhassan; Maaveeran starring Rajinikanth; the first 70mm Tamil Film, Engalayum Vazha Vidungal a film which was notable for animals talking on screen; Spy Kids 3D using Anaglyph technology for the first time; and Jai Vedalam the first film to be released in 3D in four languages.

He was elected president of the Tamil Film Producers' Council (TFPC) in 2013 and has worked on issues including title registration, financially supporting bankrupt producers, and helping see through the release of delayed projects. Other initiatives include streamlining and reducing the cost of publicity and having actors participate in all promotional activities for their films.

KR has also written a book Idhuthaan Cinema (This is Cinema) in Tamil published in 2003. It details the nuances of cinema and predicts its future viewed from today. He has been an authority on cinema since the early 1980s giving the industry insights and a way forward for the years ahead.

KR worked at Raadaan Mediaworks as vice president.

Member and Honorary Positions

He was one of the members of an eight-member advisory committee, which included several personalities from across the country, to advise the Honorable Union Minister in the Indian Ministry of Information and Broadcasting Mrs.Sushma Swaraj on major issues related to policy and other matters pertaining to the Indian film industry in 2001.

He also served on the five-member committee appointed by the Government of Tamil Nadu in 1989 to study and submit a white paper on the state of the Tamil Film Industry.

Filmography

As director

As Distributor

As actor
Pondatti Thevai (1990)
Kadhal Virus (2002)

References

External links
 
 Official Website

Tamil film directors
Living people
Film producers from Chennai
Tamil film producers
1953 births
M.G.R. Government Film and Television Training Institute alumni
20th-century Indian film directors
21st-century Indian film directors
Film directors from Chennai
Indian film distributors